The IBM 6400 family of line matrix printers were modern highspeed business computer printers introduced by IBM in 1995. These printers were designed for use on a variety IBM systems including mainframes, servers, and PCs.

Configuration
The 6400 was available in a choice of open pedestal (to minimize floor size requirements) or an enclosed cabinet (for quiet operation). Three models existed, with print speeds of 500, 1000 or 1500 lines/minute.

When configured with the appropriate graphics option, it could print mailing bar codes "certified by the U.S. Postal service. Twelve configurations were commonly sold by IBM.

Rebadged
These printers were manufactured by Printronix Corp and rebranded for IBM. All internal parts had the Printronix Logo and/or artwork. Although they once did, IBM no longer manufactures printers. One of their old printer divisions became Lexmark The other became the IBM Printing Systems Division, which was subsequently sold to Ricoh in 2007.

References

6400
Line printers
Computer-related introductions in 1995